Robert Carew (1899–1969) was an Australian rules footballer .

Robert Carew may also refer to:

 Robert Carew, 1st Baron Carew (1787–1856), Irish politician
 Robert Carew, 2nd Baron Carew (1818–1881), Irish politician
 Robert Carew, 3rd Baron Carew (1860–1923), Irish peer